The following list introduces the characters from the Magical Girl Raising Project light novel series.

Recurring characters

Active
  

Introduced in volume 1; she is a well-known magical girl within N-City who has always dreamed of becoming a magical girl. Her magical girl outfit is a white schoolgirl uniform covered with flowers. She survives the events of volume 1 without killing anyone, but her ideology was shattered by what happened, causing her to grow cold and cynical. Afterwards, she began hunting down evil Magical Girls to prevent any further tragedies from happening, her achievements eventually earning her the title Magical Girl Hunter. After Ripple goes missing following the events of Limited her overarching goal in the series becomes finding her.

Her ability allows her to hear the voices of anyone in distress. As the series progressed this ability evolves, allowing her read peoples minds. She also gains access to a variety of magical items, including Swim Swim's halberd, ' Ruler', and Princess Inferno's Fire Guandao.

  

Introduced in volume 1; she is an anti-social high school student who lives alone and is prone to getting into fights. Her magicial girl outfit is a ninja-style attire. She lives through the events of volume 1, though lost both her left eye and arm. Afterward, she grew to be very protective of Snow White and intended to stop fighting, but eventually returned to it when she saw how brutal and aggressive Snow White had become and believed she needed help. During Limited, she was forced to join the investigation team. She was believed dead following the events of Limited but was actually kidnapped and brainwashed by Pythie Frederica. She went on to serve Pythie as an assassin until her brainwashing became undone at the end of ACES. Afterward, she went on the run out of guilt over the crimes she committed while brainwashed.

Her ability allows her to never miss a shot with her shuriken. Despite this description, it is not limited to just shurikens; it also applies to any other object that she throws. With her Magical Girl form also come a variety of weapons, including shuriken, kunai and a katana.

 
Introduced in Restart; she is Pfle's butler. She wears a black nurse outfit with small wings on her back as her Magical Girl outfit. In RESTART, she is a member of Team Pfle and later works solo. She lives through the events of RESTART and continues to be Pfle's servant. However, throughout RESTART and beyond, she grows worried that her mistress is becoming a criminal and begins going behind her back. During the events of ACES, she is kidnapped by Princess Deluge to blackmail Pfle and laters ends up being brainwashed by Puk Puck. In QUEENS, she is still brainwashed and put to work to fix the First Mage's Device so Puk Puck might use it to extend her brainwashing to the entire Magical Kingdom, bringing her into direct conflict with Pfle. In the end, her distrust toward her mistress, combined with the brainwashing, finally reaches a boiling point and she ends up fatally injuring her. Before she succumbed to her wounds, however, Pfle had the Second Lapis Lazuline seal away her memories of her, knowing she would have been unable to live with herself after having killed her. She survives the events of QUEENS but is left a shell of her former self without her memories of Pfle.

Her ability lets her magically upgrade any mechanical object. She also owns a gigantic wrench as her primary weapon and a pair of giant scissors which she uses as a secondary weapon.

 
A recurring antagonist; she has a twisted mindset that views the world in anime logic. Her Magical Girl outfit resembles a fortune teller. She becomes Snow White's new mentor following her selection exam and comes to develop an obsession with her, believing her to be the "ideal Magical Girl". She was eventually arrested by Snow White after she discovered her true nature. She was broken out of jail by Tot Pop during Limited and becomes the behind-the-scenes leader of the escaped criminals. She survives the events of Limited and abducts Ripple. Afterward, she secretly manipulated the events of JOKERS, ACES and QUEENS from the shadows while continuing to observe Snow White's progress.

Her ability lets her see people through a crystal ball as long as she holds a strand of her target's hair. She is also able to open portals to and from her target. After Limited, she also takes possession of Pukin's sword. This gives her the additional ability to alter a person's mind, though only one person at a time.

A mage and a member of the Magical Kingdom's examination division. She is easy to get stressed and annoyed, in which case she has a tendency to use strong language. She dresses as a witch. During Limited, she is partners with her younger sister Hana and leader of the investigation team. She survives the events of Limited and becomes friends with 7753 and Tepsekemei. During QUEENS, Pfle brings her to investigate the Puk Faction and is used by her to create a casus belli to attack the Puk Faction. She later partners up with Uluru after rescuing her and joins the battle against the Puk Faction. She survives the events of QUEENS but is left having the clean up the aftermath of the battle.

Since she isn't a Magical Girl but a mage, Mana doesn't have an ability. She can, however, cast a variety of spells and owns a large supply of magic items.

 
A member of the Magical Kingdom's human recourses division; she dislikes her job and actually wants to do more active work like her idol Snow White. The top of her magical girl outfit resembles a male middle school student uniform while the bottom is more like a dress. During Limited, Pfle becomes her new boss and gives her the chance to prove herself by letting her join the investigation team. She survives the events of Limited and afterward becomes Pfle's messenger to Pythie Frederica.

Her ability lies in her goggles, which have the ability to scan anything she sees through it for information. The goggles have also been upgraded by Shadow Gale, adding a communication device to allow her to send written messages to Pfle and vice versa.

 
A member of the Pure Elements; she is a popular middle school student. Her magical girl attire is a very revealing outfit with shell decorations. Unbeknownst to her, she and her comrades were unknowingly being used by Pfle and the First Lapis Lazuline to create man-made magical girls and she begins to realize the truth after meeting the normal magical girl Prism Cherry. She survives the events of JOKERS. However, blaming herself for her comrades' deaths, she becomes the leader of a group of rogue magical girls and sets out on a quest for revenge. After the events of ACES and QUEENS, however, she gives up revenge after realizing that she was being used by the First Lapis Lazuline again.

Her ability allows her to create and manipulate water and ice. She also owns a magical trident which she used as her primary weapon.

Inactive

Snow White's mascot character. He was initially Keek's mascot during RESTART. However, he hated her and their relationship only got worse until he finally ratted her out to Snow White. He survives the events of RESTART and Snow White takes him in as her mascot character. While working together with Snow White, he grows attached to her. He is very worried about her wellbeing, seeing just how broken she is from the events of her selection exam. At the end of QUEENS, Pythie Frederica shuts his system down and sends him into space, effectively killing him.

Deceased
 
Heiress to her family's fortune; she is a very intelligent and cunning young lady. Her Magical Girl form is that of a young lady in a wheelchair; despite this, she can walk just fine. To her, Shadow Gale comes first in everything: during her initial selection exam, she made a deal with Cranberry and manipulated ninety-eight other candidates into killing each other. In RESTART, she is the leader of Team Pfle and later a member of Team Bell. She survives the events of RESTART but becomes disillusioned with the Magical Kingdom. Afterward, she begins planning to overthrow the Magical Kingdom. To do so, she secretly manipulated the events of both Limited and JOKERS from the shadows. However, during JOKERS, she was forced to erase her own memories when the Magical Kingdom started to become aware of her activities. She later regains these memories, and allies with the Osk faction, helping them to storm the building around the First Mage's device. Pfle is killed at the end of QUEENS, protecting Shadow Gale.

Her ability allows her to move her wheelchair at supersonic speeds. The wheelchair has also been upgraded by Shadow Gale, further increasing its speed and adding magical lasers and shields.

Magical Girl Raising Project

Semi-Survivors
 

A 24-year old unemployed lazy girl, who still enjoys helping people. She wears pajamas and has cloud-like creatures coming out of her hair as her magical girl outfit. Using her ability to enter other people's dreams, she helps people by fighting off nightmares, although this doesn't earn her any Magical Candies. She is the first magical girl to die after placing last in the first ranking. However, it is later revealed that only her body died while her spirit continues to roam other peoples dreams.

Her ability allows her to enter the dreams of other people. While in this dream world, she is all-powerful, being able to make anything she thinks real.

Casualties
  

An adult female office worker of indeterminate age. As a magical girl, she is a self-proclaimed Queen based in an abandoned temple in N-City along with her group of Magical Girl followers, including Swim Swim, Tama, Minael, and Yunael. She wears a royal princess-like attire as her magical girl outfit. She is the second magical girl to die after being betrayed by Swim Swim and placing last in the second ranking.

Her ability allows her to use her scepter to force anyone in front of her to obey her commands. However, she must be within 5 meters to her target to use it and she must stand completely still while using it.

  

A close friend and ally of Snow White, revealed to be Koyuki's male childhood friend who also loves magical girls. Despite being a boy, his body becomes that of a girl's while transformed. As a magical girl, La Pucelle wears a Dragon Knight style attire, with draconic motifs in her armor as his outfit. He is the third magical girl to die after being killed by Cranberry.

His ability allows him to change the length and size of his sword at will. The sword also comes with a scabbard, which has the same ability.
  

A 15-year old robotic magical girl, who tends to care more about financial gain than helping others. Throughout her life she has always taken what she perceives to be the easy way out, even going as far as to quit school and run away from home. She is the fourth magical girl to die, killed by Hardgore Alice upon attempting to kill Snow White.

Her ability allows her to obtain a random futuristic gadget from her backpack once per day, but even she cannot predict what it will be, and at the end of the day, it disappears. She is also able to fly as a result of her robotic body.

  

The younger one of the two "Peaky Angels" twins, allied with Ruler. She wears an angelic-style dress and has one wing on her left side for her outfit. She acts very childish but is actually a college student. She is the fifth magical girl to die after she is killed by Winterprison.

Her ability allows her to shapeshift into any living being. She is also able to fly as a result of her wing.

  

Sister Nana's lover. She is a college student that publicly known as the most powerful magical girl in N-City. In truth, however, this image was merely fabricated by Sister Nana, who constantly put herself in danger to allow her to be saved by her. She wears a thick winter coat as her Magical Girl outfit. She is the sixth magical girl to die, dying from blood loss following attacks from the Peaky Angels and Swim Swim.

Her ability lets her create walls of any form, depending on the terrain.

 

A sadistic 39-year old magical girl hired by the N-City's criminal underground. She wears a cowboy hat and has a wild-west style attire as her magical girl outfit. She is the seventh magical girl to die when she shot a piece of glass that Ripple threw at her, causing her to be impaled by the glass shards (in the anime, the shards were a distraction and she was killed by taking a shuriken to the head).

Her ability allows her to magically enhance any weapon she uses. She also owns a variety of arms, from knives to pistols, to rifles, to grades, and to landmines.

  

A cheerful veteran magical girl who is paired up with Ripple. She wears a classic black witch outfit and a witch hat as her magical girl outfit. She talks casually with an "ore" male self-referencing pronoun. She is actually the pregnant 19-year-old housewife of a young politician. She also used to be the leader of a biker gang. She is the eighth magical girl to die after being stabbed in the back by Swim Swim; Her unborn child died with her.

Her ability allows her to fly at breakneck speeds on her magical broomstick, Rapid Swallow.

  

A veteran N-City Magical Girl and Weiss Winterprison's lover. In real life, she is a college student and a sweet girl who lives with Shizuka and has dedicated her career to protecting the city and bringing a message of peace. She wears a nun-like dress as her magical girl outfit. Despite being much stronger than Weiss, Nana often relies on her for protection in order to fulfill her fairytale fantasies; this ultimately proves to be her undoing, as Winterprison's death completely breaks her, since she had gone out looking to cause a confrontation with Swim Swim's group in order to be "saved" by Winterprison. She commits suicide by hanging following Winterprison's death, becoming the ninth magical girl to die.

Her ability allows her to enhance a person's physical capabilities.

  

A young magical girl, she was recently chosen and became the 16th magical girl of N-City. She wears an Alice in Wonderland-style dress, draped in black as her magical girl Outfit. Before becoming a Magical Girl, she considered herself a nuisance and secretly planned to commit suicide. However, after Snow White helped her, she came to strongly admire her and dedicated her entire life to helping her. She is the tenth magical girl to die, killed in her untransformed state by Swim Swim.

Her ability lets her regenerate any damage taken, allowing her to survive even beheading or dismemberment.

  

The older one of the two "Peaky Angels" twins, allied with Ruler. She wears an angelic-style dress and has one wing on her right side for her outfit. Initially, like her sister, she was very childish but is actually a college student. However, after Yunael is killed she becomes a lot more violent. She is the eleventh magical girl to die after a failed ambush on Cranberry.

Her ability allows her to shapeshift into any non-living object. She is also able to fly as a result of her wing.

A recluse living within the ruins in the outskirts of N-City. Her outfit is decorated with wildflowers and leaves, and her appearance is that of an elf. It is eventually revealed that the death game is actually a selection exam and she is the overseer. She was once part of a selection exam that went horribly wrong, causing everyone except her to be killed by a demon. She was able to kill the demon, after which she gained an obsession with fighting strong enemies. After becoming a selection exam overseer she started putting Magical Girls through death games, hoping to find a worthy opponent. She is the twelfth magical girl to die after being killed by Tama. Despite this, her influence is felt throughout the series.

Her ability lets her manipulate sound waves. She can use this ability in a variety of ways, like distracting her opponents, enhancing her hearing and creating powerful sonic attacks.

  

A slightly shy and nervous girl, allied with Ruler. She wears a dog costume, complete with large paw gloves as her magical girl outfit.  While she is less competent than her other teammates in Ruler's team, she was happy just to be able to enter the team. She is the thirteenth magical girl to die, killed by Swim Swim upon discovering her identity.

Her ability allows her to create a hole, up to 1m in diameter and 5m in depth, on any surface. She eventually also gains a magical cloak that can make her invisible.

  

A 7-year-old rather quiet girl, she is allied with and extremely loyal to Ruler. Eventually, she becomes disillusioned with Ruler's leadership and launches a scheme to overthrow her, resulting in Ruler's death and Swim Swim taking her place. She wears a white swimsuit with headphones as her magical girl outfit. She is the fourteenth and final magical girl to die in the first volume, killed by Ripple.

Her ability lets her transform herself and anything around her into liquid. She eventually also gains a magical halberd which she names Ruler. Her weaknesses are light and sound.

The mascot character of the social network game known as the Magical Girl Raising Project and the familiar spirit who oversees the magical girl project. He orders the magical girls to fight each other claiming that the city's mana supply will be depleted causing the city's destruction if the number of magical girls is not reduced. In actuality, he is an overseer who collaborated with his master, Cranberry, to turn the dull, boring selection exam process for magical girls into a deathmatch, with Fav sending falsified reports back to his superiors to hide what he and Cranberry were doing. He is finally destroyed after Ripple destroys his terminal.

Magical Girl Raising Project: RESTART

Survivors
 
Leader of Team Clantail; she has a stern demeanor. Her Magical Girl form resembles a centaur. She is actually a shy middle school student who struggles to make friends, the only ones she was being animals. She survives the events of RESTART and afterward begins to strive to make human friends.

Her ability allows her to shapeshift the lower part of her body into any animal she has extensive knowledge of. She eventually also acquires a magical spear and shield.

The primary antagonist of RESTART; she is the one who abducted the other Magical Girls and forced them into a death game as punishment for having survived Cranberry's tests. She dresses as a mad scientist as her Magical Girl attire. She is obsessed with the idea that Magical Girls must be pure and innocent and despises people like Cranberry who tarnished that image; this hatred for Cranberry runs so deep that she even hates her victims, seeing their survival as proof that they were willing to betray the ideals of the Magical Girl to save themselves. She is similarly obsessed with Snow White, whom she views as the "ideal Magical Girl" who won Cranberry's death game without killing anyone. She lives through the events of RESTART. However, Snow White revealed to her that her mentor (Pythie Frederica), who taught her everything she knew, was a supporter of Cranberry, causing her to suffer a mental breakdown as she is faced with the flaws in her logic.

Her ability lets her create a cyber world. While in this cyber world, she is all-powerful, being able to make anything she thinks of real.

Casualties
 
Leader of Team Daisy; a well known Magical Girl who used to have her own anime series. She wears a traditional Magical Girl outfit decorated with flower-like decorations. She is currently a college student who struggles to find time to be a Magical Girl during her busy schedule. She is the first Magical Girl to die after a cyber world monster reflected her "Daisy Beam" back at her.

Her ability allows her to fire magical beams from her hands. It is guaranteed to kill whatever it hits. She calls this ability "Daisy Beam". She is able to fire either small beams from her fingers or large ones from her palms.

 
A member of Team Pfle; a self-proclaimed hero of justice. She wears an American superhero outfit as her Magical Girl attire. She is Nemurin's real-life cousin. She is the second Magical Girl to die after being hit on the head with a rock from behind. It is later revealed that Melville was the one who killed her.

Her ability lets her control her own weight and the weight of others. She is also capable of flight by using her ability to make herself lichter than air.

 
A member of Team Daisy; often just called Genopsyko. She wears a leather suit resembling a cat as her Magical Girl attire. In real life, she is a manga artist. She is the third Magical Girl to die, killed by Akane. Her corpse is later used by Rionetta to kill @Meow-Meow.

Her ability lies in her Magical Girl outfit, which is completely indestructible whenever she has the visor of her helmet pulled down. However, an attack that ignores the suit, such as Akane's power, can still hurt her.

 
A mentally unstable Magical Girl who attacks anyone she comes across and works solo. She wears a samurai outfit as her Magical Girl attire. Her entire family was murdered during one of Cranberry's previous selections exams. As the result, she suffers from PTSD and, having had her memories of her selection exam removed, furiously searches for a "Musician", the only thing she remembers about Cranberry. She is the fourth Magical Girl to die, killed by @Meow-Meow after she snapped and attempted to kill the other Magical Girls.

Her ability allows her to cut everything within her sight with her katana regardless of distance. The cut registers when the katana is swung down.

A member of Team Bell; a very stubborn little girl who doesn't let any near her team's hunting grounds. She wears a hamster costume on top of a swimsuit as her Magical Girl outfit. She is actually Nonako Miyokata's pet hamster, gaining a human body upon becoming a magical girl. She is the fifth Magical Girl to die after everyone was forced to compare Magical Candies and she placed last due to the ranking being messed with. It is later revealed that this was Melville's doing.

Her ability lets her increase in size with no known limit.

 
A member of Team Daisy; she cares deeply about her teammates. She wears a traditional Chinese martial artist outfit as her Magical Girl attire. After Magical Daisy's death, she becomes the new leader of Team Daisy. She was once part of one of Cranberry's selection exams where both of her best friends were killed. She is the sixth Magical Girl to die, killed by a cyber world monster after Genopsyko, who was presumed dead, appeared before her and pushed into the monster's attack. It is later revealed that this was Rionetta's doing, who manipulated Genopsyko's corpse using her ability.

She possesses a set of scrolls. Her ability allows her to seal any object into these scrolls.

 
A member of Team Clantail; a girl who just moved from Europe to Japan and struggles with the language. She dresses as a Miko as her Magical Girl attire. She constantly argues with Rionetta, who cannot stand her bad Japanese. She is the seventh Magical Girl to die after her arguing with Rionetta finally reached a boiling point and erupted into a fight which ended with her being killed by a cyber world monster. It is later revealed that her and Rionetta's hostility towards each other was a result of Nokko using her ability to ratchet up their emotions.

Her ability lets her befriend and tame any animal that wears her special ribbon, though only one at a time.

 
The leader of Team Bell; a young adult who always admired and wanted to be a detective. She wears a detective outfit as her Magical Girl attire. In real life, she works for a private detective company, though this amounts to little more than basic chores. Throughout RESTART, she makes it her mission to find out who is behind the mysterious deaths of Masked Wonder, Cherna Mouse, and @Meow-Meow. She is the eight Magical Girl to die, ambushed from behind by the very murderer she had been hunting. However, she leaves behind valuable intel that ends up exposing Melville as the murderer.

Her abilities allow her to give faces to buildings and bring them to life by kissing them. While not very useful in combat, it can be used to gather information.

 
A member of Team Clantail; a sarcastic yet sharp-tongued young lady. In her Magical Girl form, she turns into a living doll. She desires the prize money for beating the death game in order to pay off her father's debt with the mafia. It is eventually revealed that Melville bribed her into using Genopsyko's corpse to cause @Meow-Meow's death. She is the ninth Magical Girl to die, killed by Melville after she was unable to betray Team Clantail and turned on her instead.

Her ability lets her manipulate dolls. Despite this description, it applies to any non-living humanoid objects, including corpses.

 
A member of Team Clantail; a timid middle school student who lacks confidence. Her Magical Girl outfit resembles a Chef's uniform. She uses her status as a Magical Girl to boost her confidence, though this was quickly shattered upong meeting and comparing herself to her amazing teammates. Throughout RESTART, her confidence slowly increases; she becomes her team's cook and moral center and eventually even begins to fight with her teammates. She is the tenth Magical Girl to die when she used herself to shield Clantail from Melville.

Her ability allows her to turn anything she touches with her hands for five minutes, regardless of size, into delicious food.

 
A member of Team Bell and later a solo player; she talks with a heavy speech impediment (rendered as a thick accent in the English release), making her difficult to understand. Her Magical Girl outfit is decorated with flowers and her appearance is that of an elf. She is eventually revealed to be the one responsible for the deaths of Masked Wonder, Cherna Mouse, and Detec Bell. She also is the former apprentice of Cranberry and is sickly infatuated with her to the point of attempting to kill the other magical girls to carry on her legacy. She is the eleventh Magical Girl to die, killed by Clantail while being restrained by Lapiz Lazuline.

Her ability allows her to change the color of any surface. She primarily uses this ability to camouflage herself, making her seemingly invisible. She also owns a magical harpoon.

  
A member of Team Bell; a childish and enthusiastic high school dropout. She wears a blue dress with a tiger's tail and a cape made of tiger fur as her Magical Girl outfit. She is actually the second Magical Girl with the name Lapis Lazuline, having inherited it from her mentor, The First Lapis Lazuline; her true Magical Girl name is Blue Comet. She is the only participant who was not a survivor of Cranberry's tests, as Keek had mistaken her for her mentor (who was the actual survivor). She is the twelfth Magical Girl to die after succumbing to wounds she sustained while fighting Melville.

She possesses a set of magical gems and her ability allows her to instantly teleport to wherever these gems are located.

 
A member of Team Daisy and later Team Bell; she is a shy and timid ten-year-old elementary school student who has been a Magical Girl since she was five years old. Despite her initial appearance, however, she is also rather devious, having used her ability to make her initially rowdy classmates and abusive teacher into an ideal class. Her magical girl outfit resembles a maid costume. Her mother has been hospitalized, she thus desires the prize money for beating the death game in order to pay the hospital bills. She is eventually revealed to be the Evil King the other Magical Girls are supposed to kill while she, in turn, is supposed to kill them. She did this by making them emotionally unstable, causing them to kill each other. She becomes the thirteenth and final Magical Girl to die when she commits suicide to repent for her actions.

Her ability allows her to manipulate the emotions of those close to her. She also owns a magical broom which she can use as a weapon.

Magical Girl Raising Project: Limited

Survivors

One of the Namiyama Middle School magical girls; she is the pet turtle of the school science lab, gaining a human body upon becoming a magical girl. Because she only just became self-conscious, she struggles to act human. Her magical girl form resembles a genie. She refuses to go back to being a turtle now that she is human, staying in her magical girl form at all times. Therefore she resides in a lamp whenever she needs to stay hidden. She survives the events of Limited and gets taken in by 7753. Afterward, she begins to learn how to be human.

Her ability allows her to transform herself into smoke, making herself invulnerable to physical attacks. She is also able to fly by using her ability to make herself lighter than air.

Casualties
 
One of the Namiyama Middle School magical girls; she is a second-year student who dreams of traveling the world and going on adventures. She beats up anyone who dares to make fun of her dream, unknowingly becoming known as the biggest bully in school in the process. Her magical girl outfit resembles a pirate captain. She is the first character to die, killed by Sonia Bean.

Her ability allows her to summon a magical pirate ship complete with a cannon to use as a weapon. She also possesses a magical cutlass which she can use as a melee weapon.

One of the escaped criminals; Pukin's simple-minded underling. She wears a patchwork dress as her magical girl outfit. She grew up as an orphan until she was discovered by Pukin and she made her into a magical girl. She was arrested along with Pukin after their crimes were discovered by the Magical Kingdom and put into prison until they were broken out by Pythie. She is the second character to die, killed by Archfiend Pam.

Her ability allows her to instantly disintegrate everything that she comes into contact with.

A member of the investigation team from the Magical Kingdom's foreign affairs division; she is known as the strongest magical girl within the Magical Kingdom and is headmistress of a strict school which teaches magical girls how to fight. She is also Cranberry's former teacher and the one who originally gave her the title "Musician of the Forest". She desires to fight strong opponents, but only to test her physical limits. Her magical girl attire is a dark, very revealing, swimsuit-like outfit. She is both the third and fourth character to die after being stabbed in the back by Rain Pow.

Her ability allows her to manipulate her four wings in any way that she wants. She is able to use this ability to produce a variety of elemental based attacks.

 
One of the escaped criminals and the one who originally broke the others out of prison; she is Pythie's apprentice. Her magical girl outfit resembles a rock star. She is both the third and fourth character to die, killed by Rain Pow.

Her ability allows her to materialize musical notes using her guitar which she can use as projectiles.

A member of the investigation team from the Magical Kingdom's examination division; Mana's partner and adoptive younger sister. She is generally a gentle and calm person, though she is willing to become violent should the situation demand it. In her magical girl form, she wears a Japanese kimono and has rabbit ears. She is the fifth character to die after succumbing to wounds that she sustained while fighting Pukin.

Her ability allows her to enhance her senses and the senses of those nearby. However, if she enhances her or someone else's senses too much their bodies will be unable to handle it, causing them faint.

The mascot character of the Namiyama Middle School magical girls; she is the one who turned the others into magical girls in order to defeat "an evil witch". In reality, however, she is actually a criminal wanted by the Magical Kingdom and is using her teammates to fight off the investigation team. She also has a mysterious master who she is working together with. Her reasons for becoming a criminal are simply because she was tired of all the "goody-two-shoes" magical girls. She is the sixth character to die, killed by Rain Pow while the latter was brainwashed by Pukin. Later, she is devoured by Pukin, who claims that fairies are high in nutrition. The purpose of this is to gain a stat boost.

 
One of the Namiyama Middle School magical girls; she is a shy and withdrawn first-year student who never stands out. Her magical girl outfit resembles a mailman. She has problems making friends, the only one she has being Rain Pow. She cares so much about her that even after Rain Pow is revealed to be Toko's master she remains loyal to her and even allowed herself to be used as a hostage by her, still believing that they were friends. She is the seventh character to die, killed by Rain Pow while the latter was brainwashed by Pukin.

Her ability allows her to give any object that she touches wings which will return that object to its owner. She is able to use this ability in an offensive way by making the object fly at high speed and make an impact with its owner.

 
One of the Namiyama Middle School magical girls; she is a first-year student and Postarie's only friend. Her magical girl outfit is a colorful leather suit. It is eventually revealed that she is Toko's master and the assassin that both the investigation team and the escaped prisoners are looking for. She grew up at the mercy of an abusive older sister until she hospitalized her after Toko made her into a magical girl. Her personality is described as "contradictory", truly caring about Postarie yet using her to fight off the investigation team and later as a hostage. She is eventually brainwashed by Pukin into becoming her servant until she is killed when she crashes into the magical barrier surrounding B-City. She is both the eight and ninth character to die.

Her ability is initially believed to allow her to make rainbow bridges. However, it is later revealed that she can use the edges of the rainbows as incredibly sharp blades and the sides as shields.

 
Leader of the Namiyama Middle School magical girls; she is a second-year student and the class president of Class D as well as a huge magical girl fan. Her magical girl outfit resembles a wedding dress covered in chains. She betrays her teammates when she is brainwashed by Pukin. However, she is eventually freed from the brainwashing and, while feeling guilty about her actions, eventually resumes her position as leader. She is both the eight and ninth character to die when she crashes into the magical barrier surrounding B-City after being tricked by Pythie.

Her ability allows her to make it impossible for others to break a promise they make with her. Also, because they chose her to be their leader, she can use this ability to force her teammates to do whatever she says.

 
One of the Namiyama Middle School magical girls; she is a second-year student. Her magical girl outfit resembles a stage magician. While publicly known as Captain Grace's best friend, she secretly always despised her for dragging her along with her without her consent. After Captain Grace's death, she falls into a state of self-hatred, as a part of her can't help but be happy that she is finally gone. She is both the tenth and eleventh character to die after succumbing to wounds that she sustained while fighting Pukin.

Her ability is a form of teleportation and allows her to make two objects that are hidden from sight switch places. However, she is unable to teleport herself.

 
One of the Namiyama Middle School magical girls; she is a teacher who likes to push her students to bring out their potential. However, this causes most of her students to hate her and give her the nickname "monster". In her magical girl form, she is a little girl wearing a ballerina outfit. She is eventually captured by the investigation team and joins them upon learning the truth of the situation. She is both the tenth and eleventh character to die after succumbing to wounds that she sustained while fighting Pukin.

Her ability allows her to manipulate the ribbons that her magical girl outfit is composed of.

The primary antagonist of Limited; she is the leader of the escaped criminals on the surface, but is actually being manipulated by Pythie. She was once the head of the Magical Kingdom's examination division and used her authority to kill anyone that she considered dangerous, believing that her actions were completely justified. However, after this was exposed, she was arrested and put into prison until she was broken out by Pythie. Her magical girl outfit resembles a Musketeer. Following Sonia Bean's death, she grows increasingly unstable, even turning on Pythie. She is the twelfth and final character to die after she crashed into the magical barrier surrounding B-City.

Her ability lies in her sword, which has the ability to alter the minds of those it cuts. This ability can be used in a variety of ways, such as brainwashing, injecting information directly into one's mind, suppressing senses, erasing pain and sealing away memories. However, it can only be applied to one person at a time.

Magical Girl Raising Project: JOKERS

Survivors
 
A former student at Archfiend Pam's school until she got expelled due to her violent behavior. In her magical girl form, she is part-plant. She is actually a very intellectual woman. However, when she becomes a magical girl she loses all self-control and begins picking fights with everyone she meets. She survives the events of JOKERS and later gets a job as a teacher at the same school that Snow White attends.

Her ability allows her to grow magical flowers on top of her head by consuming seeds. Each of these flowers possesses a different ability. Also, because of her plant physiology, she gets stronger and heals faster when exposed to dirt, water and/or sunlight.

Semi-Survivors

A mysterious masked magical girl who is a mute and acts like a mime. Her magical girl outfit is a clown costume. Throughout JOKERS she guides the other magical girls, bringing them all together and helping them when they are in trouble. She was believed dead following a failed suicide attack on Grim Heart and the Joker Shufflin but actually survived. At the end of JOKERS it is revealed that she is actually Ripple under the effects of Pythie's brainwashing. Afterward, Pythie wipes all of Ripple's memories as Stańczyka, effectively erasing the persona of Stańczyka from existence.

Her ability is described as "To amaze people with magical street performance". In reality, however, this is Pythie providing her with magic items through her own ability.

Casualties

A member of the Magical Kingdom's foreign affairs division. Her appearance resembles a vampire. She is partners with Umbrain, whom she treats like a daughter. While initially acting as the de facto leader of the other magical girls, she completely loses her composure after Umbrain goes missing. When the group was ambushed by a pack of demons, she is critically injured and dies after taking one of them out. She is the first magical girl to die.

Her ability allows her to manipulate her own blood and change it into any kind of liquid. She also a carries around several small vials of her blood to use as weapons.

 
A member of the Magical Kingdom's foreign affairs division. She is Lady Proud's partner and dislikes how the latter constantly coddles her. She appearance is that of a little girl in a raincoat. She eventually goes missing and is later revealed to have been abducted by Grim Heart. She is the second magical girl to die, beheaded by the Joker Shufflin.

Her ability lies in her umbrella which can block any attack. No matter how powerful or fast the attack is, to the user of the umbrella it will feel as if it is something soft bumping into it.

A freelance magical girl who came to S-City to investigate the man-made magical girls for the reward money. She is partners with Kafuria. She resembles the Caterpillar from Alice in Wonderland. While looking for the man-made magical girls, she and Kafuria meet Filru and, while initially rivals, they eventually partner up. She is the third magical girl to die after being ambushed by several Club Shufflins.

Her ability allows her to create huge bubbles using her magical straw.

 
A freelance magical girl who came to S-City to investigate the man-made magical girls for the reward money. She is partners with Uttakatta. In her magical girl form, she resembles a widow and has black wings at her waists. While looking for the man-made magical girls, she and Kafuria meet Filru and, while initially rivals, they eventually partner up. In the past, she believed her ability to be useless. However, she eventually came to take pride in it. She eventually goes missing and is later revealed to have been abducted by Grim Heart. She is the fourth magical girl to die, beheaded by the Joker Shufflin.

Her ability allows her to see who out of a group of people will be the first to die. In addition, if she is aware of how they die she can prevent it. She is also able to fly using her wings.

 
Leader of the Pure Elements; she is a college student. Not having had a good childhood, she cares deeply about children; though this causes some to mistake her for a lolicon. Her magical girl attire is a revealing outfit with Ancient Egyptian decorations. She is eventually captured by Grim Heart. When Grim Heart intended to have Princess Tempest beheaded by the Joker Shufflin, she took her place and was beheaded instead. She is the fifth magical girl to die.

Her ability makes her skin harden, making her nearly invulnerable to physical attacks. She also possesses a huge magical hammer that can cause earthquakes.

 
A member of the Pure Elements; she is a high school student. She was once an athlete until her career came to a halt when she broke her leg, leaving her unable to run. Her magical girl attire is a very revealing outfit with flame decorations. She and Snow White were childhood friends until the latter moved to N-City. She is the sixth magical girl to die, dying in Snow White's arms from wounds that she sustained while fighting the Joker Shufflin.

Her ability allows her to create and manipulate fire. She also possesses a magical Guandao, which shares her ability.

 
A member of the Pure Elements; she is an elementary school student. She has a crush on an older boy who goes to the same school as her sister, causing her to believe that they are love rivals; though this is not actually the case. In her magical girl form, she is a teenager wearing a very revealing outfit with leaf decorations. She eventually goes missing and is later revealed to have been abducted by Grim Heart. She is the seventh magical girl to die, beheaded by the Joker Shufflin.

Her ability allows her to manipulate wind. One way that she can use this ability is in order to fly. She also possesses a magical boomerang.

A normal magical girl who runs a Beauty salon where she gives others makeovers. She is Marika's best friend and the only person who can keep her under control. Marika drags her with her to S-City against her will. Her magical girl outfit resembles a fashionista. Throughout JOKERS, she is one of the few who manages to maintain their composure. She is the eight magical girl to die after having her throat stabbed by the King of Clubs Shufflin.

Her ability allows her to magically change another's appearance. She also possesses a pair of magical scissors to use as a weapon.

 
A normal magical girl who always desired to be special. After meeting and befriending Princess Deluge, she becomes the newest member of the Pure Elements. Her magical girl outfit is a white reflective dress with cherry decorations. As her bond with the Pure Elements grows, she becomes divided between them and the Magical Kingdom. She was believed to have died after being ambushed by the Joker Shufflin, but actually saved by Pythie. She later returns to help fight the Shufflin army. She is the ninth magical girl to die after succumbing to wounds that she sustained while fighting the Ace of Spades Shufflin.

Her ability allows her to manipulate the reflections in mirrors. Initially, this ability appeared to be useless. However, it is later revealed, after training with Pythie, that she can use the reflective cloth of her magical girl outfit to produce light, which can blind enemies.

A former warden who got fired in the aftermath of Limited. Needing the reward money, she leaves for S-City to investigate the man-made magical girls. Her magical girl outfit is a dress that seems to be entirely punctured together. While looking for the man-made magical girls, she meets Uttakatta and Kufuria and, while initially rivals, eventually partners up with them. She eventually realizes that she doesn't really want the prize money, instead just wanting to feel needed. She is the tenth and final magical girl confirmed to die, killed by the Ten of Spades Shufflin while protecting Princess Deluge.

Her ability allows her to puncture anything using a magical needle and thread. While the nature of her ability makes it so that the needle itself can't be used as a weapon, the thread is durable enough that it can't be broken even by a magical girl.

The primary antagonist of JOKERS; she is a member of the Magical Kingdom's homeland security bureau. She has the attitude of a spoiled noblewoman. She is said to resemble the Red Queen from Alice in Wonderland. While initially cooperating with the other magical girls, she eventually betrays them. It is eventually revealed that she began the man-made magical girl project, but someone stole it from her to create the Pure Elements. She thus desires to capture the Pure Elements and kill the other magical girls to keep her activities a secret. She was reportedly killed in an accident while fleeing back to the Magical Kingdom after her plan failed. She is later revealed to have been the reincarnation of one of the Three Sages, Shayta Val Osk Mer, and the leader of Osk's faction.

Her ability allows her to ignore rudeness. Anything Grim Heart deems as rude will be ignored. Attacks, sounds, even magical powers can't affect her if she doesn't give permission. In cases where she's brought to another world, like the Dream World, her power takes priority.

Grim Heart's subordinate; she is absolutely loyal to her despite the latter constantly abusing her. She is said to resemble the card soldiers from Alice in Wonderland. She was reportedly killed along with Grim Heart during an accident while fleeing back to the Magical Kingdom after Grim Heart's plan failed.

Her consciousness is split between fifty-three bodies modeled after a deck of cards, making her a one magical girl army. Each type of card has a different ability, Spades have high combat ability, Diamonds have high intelligence, Clubs can blend into the environment and Hearts have high endurance. The strength from each body is ranked from Two to Ace. There is also one Joker who is the original and possesses the abilities of all Aces. The Joker also has the ability to revive all the other bodies by beheading a magical girl. However, if the Joker dies, all bodies die. Each body is also armed with a magical spear and the Joker with a scythe

Magical Girl Raising Project: ACES/QUEENS
QUEENS is a direct continuation of ACES

Survivors

Casualties

Magical Girl Raising Project: BLACK/WHITE 
WHITE is a direct continuation of BLACK

Minor characters

One of Koyuki's friends from school. She has long black hair worn in a ponytail.

References 

Magical Girl Raising Project